Jaap Mansfeld (born 1936) is a Dutch Emeritus Professor of philosopher and a historian of philosophy.

Life
Jaap Mansfeld began his studies in 1954 at the University of Utrecht, where he received his doctorate in 1964 with a thesis on Parmenides. From 1973 until his retirement in 2001 he was a professor of ancient philosophy, and subsequently professor of History of Ancient and Medieval Philosophy,  at Utrecht University. He has been a full member of the Academia Europaea since 1989., as well as a member of the board for several scholarly journals. In 1991 he was elected a member of the Royal Netherlands Academy of Arts and Sciences. A book was published in honour of his 60th birthday in 1996 by Keimpe Algra,  Pieter Willem van der Horst, and David T. Runia. In 1998, Mansfeld was awarded the Humboldt research award for his outstanding achievements in research and teaching. Mansfeld was made an honorary citizen of the ancient city of Elea, the town of Parmenides, by the Eleatica conference in 2013.

Mansfeld's focus is on doxography, and he has had a thirty year collaboration with David Theunis Runia on the fragments and testimonia of the doxographer Aëtios.

Select publications
 
 
 
 
  With Oliver Primavesi
 
  
 
 Aëtiana : the method and intellectual context of a doxographer. with David Theunis, in five volumes.

Literature

References

External links 
 
Profile at the University of Utrecht
Bibliography (PDF-file; 360 kB)
Article on doxography in the Stanford Encyclopedia of Philosophy

1936 births
Living people
Dutch historians of philosophy
Members of the Royal Netherlands Academy of Arts and Sciences
Utrecht University alumni
Academic staff of Utrecht University
Members of Academia Europaea